Demoness from Thousand Years, also known as Chase from Beyond, is a 1990 Hong Kong action fantasy horror film directed by Jeng Wing-Chiu.

Synopsis 
When the Demoness from a Thousand Years threatens to break into the real world, a Taoist priest sends his two fairy disciples to steal the Bead of Hell, which has the power to destroy the Demoness when combined with the Heaven's Sun Bead.

Cast 

 Joey Wong as Yun Yuk Yi
 Jacky Cheung as Mambo
 Meg Lam as the Evil
 Andy Hui as An
 Tai Chi Squadron as the Gang Members
 Tiffany Lau as Yin
 Michelle Sima as Policeman
 Hsiao Ho as Modern Sifu
 Gloria Yip as Siu Yi
 Ku Feng as Ancient Sifu (cameo appearance)
 Law Ching-Ho as Policeman
 Walter Tso as the Retarded Boy's Father (cameo appearance)
 Sin-hung Tamas the Retarded Boy's Mother (cameo appearance)
 Gabriel Wong as the Retarded Boy (cameo appearance)
 Yeung Wai-Yiu
 Chow Gam-Kong as the Victim
 Cheung Siu in an extra appearance

Production 
The film's sound recordists are at 108 Records Ltd., Co. (108 錄音有限公司) and Cinefex Sound Studio Limited (特藝錄音室). Its special effects was made by Stephen Ma (馬文現).

Reception 
Demoness from Thousand Years has received mixed reception for its "H. K. Screen Art-inspired" special effects after The Child of Peach.

References

External links 

 
 

Hong Kong horror films
Hong Kong fantasy films
1990 films
1990s Hong Kong films